George Leroy Wrenn (16 April 1915  21 September 1992) was an American flying ace during World War II.

References

1915 births
1992 deaths
American World War II flying aces
Recipients of the Navy Cross (United States)
Recipients of the Distinguished Flying Cross (United States)
United States Naval Aviators
United States Navy pilots of World War II